(Romanization: Tōkyō Tōkyō) is a Japanese cuisine restaurant chain in the Philippines.

History
The first Tokyo Tokyo restaurant opened on April 22, 1985 at the Quad Carpark (later Park Square 1) in Makati and at the time was the first Japanese fast-food restaurant to serve unlimited rice with its dishes. The chain initially served Japanese dishes such as tempura, tonkatsu, yakisoba, sushi and sashimi. When it opened its first restaurants in 1985, other Japanese restaurants were more traditional; the 'mainstreaming' of the chain's market contributed to the restaurant chain's growth.

By the end of 2013, Tokyo Tokyo had 50 locations nationwide.

As of 2018, Tokyo Tokyo is owned by Hansbury Inc., under the One Food Group, which also owns the Philippine franchise for KFC and Mister Donut.

Products

Tokyo Tokyo’s menu currently offers  3 types of sushi. The chicken teriyaki and tuna misono are the house specials of Tokyo Tokyo. Tokyo Tokyo also offers yakisoba, Japanese style potato balls, miso soup and kani crab corn soup as side dishes.

References

External links
Tokyo Tokyo official website

Fast-food chains of the Philippines
Restaurants established in 1985
Companies based in Quezon City
1985 establishments in the Philippines